Arthur Culligan (July 29, 1878 – March 9, 1929) was a farmer, lumberman and political figure in New Brunswick, Canada. He represented Restigouche County in the Legislative Assembly of New Brunswick from 1912 to 1917 and Restigouche—Madawaska in the House of Commons of Canada from 1925 to 1926 as a Conservative member.

He was born in Culligan, New Brunswick. Culligan was defeated when he ran for re-election to the House of Commons in 1926.

References 
 

1878 births
1929 deaths
Members of the House of Commons of Canada from New Brunswick
Conservative Party of Canada (1867–1942) MPs
Progressive Conservative Party of New Brunswick MLAs